Reinhard Egger (born 11 September 1989) is an Austrian luger who has competed since 1999. On 21 November 2009, he finished seventh in the men's singles event at a World Cup event in Calgary.  During the 2018–19 Luge World Cup season, Egger finished third in Whistler and third in Lake Placid.

References

External links

1989 births
Living people
Austrian male lugers
Olympic lugers of Austria
Lugers at the 2014 Winter Olympics
Lugers at the 2018 Winter Olympics